Schlesinger is a German surname (in part also Jewish) meaning "Silesian"  and may refer to:
 Adam Schlesinger (1967–2020), American composer and musician
 Adolf Martin Schlesinger (1769–1838), German founder of A.M. Schlesingers Musikhandlung
 Alan Schlesinger (born 1960), American politician and Republican candidate for the U.S. Senate in Connecticut in 2006
 Alice Schlesinger (born 1988), Israeli Olympic judoka
 Arthur Meier Schlesinger, Sr. (1888–1965), American historian and professor at Harvard University
 Arthur Meier Schlesinger, Jr. (1917–2007), son of the above, American historian, social critic and former John F. Kennedy associate
 Bruno Schlesinger (1876–1962), American German-born conductor and composer who changed his name to "Bruno Walter" in 1911
 Carl Schlesinger (1813–1871), Austrian cellist
 Christina Schlesinger, American artist
 Cory Schlesinger (born 1972), American football player
 David Schlesinger (born 1960), American journalist who is the Editor-in-Chief of Reuters
 Don Schlesinger, American gaming mathematician, author, lecturer and famous blackjack player
 Elyakim Schlesinger, English rabbi 
 Frank Schlesinger (1871–1943), American astronomer
 Hanan Schlesinger, Israeli rabbi
 Hermann Irving Schlesinger (1882–1960), American chemist
 James R. Schlesinger (1929–2014), U.S. Secretary of Defense (1973–1974) and first Secretary of Energy (1977-1979)
 Joe Schlesinger (born 1928), Canadian television journalist and author
 John Schlesinger (1926–2003), British film director
 Katharine Schlesinger, British actress
 Kathleen Schlesinger, British musicologist (1862 Holywood near Belfast - 1953 London)
 Kurt Schlesinger (1902-1964), a war criminal, head of the Jewish Security Service in Westerbork transit camp
 Leon Schlesinger (1884–1949), American Looney Tunes producer
 Leonard Schlesinger, American economist
 Ludwig Schlesinger (1864–1933), Hungarian-German mathematician
 Marcus Schlesinger, Israeli swimmer
 Piero Schlesinger (1930–2020), Italian banker and lawyer
 Rudolf Schlesinger (1909–1996), German-born Professor of Comparative Law at Cornell University, Director of the Cornell Common Core Project
 T.E. (Ed) Schlesinger, American engineer and physicist
 Walter Schlesinger (1908–1984), German historian

Things that are named after people with this surname:
 Leon Schlesinger Productions, the 1933 founding name of The Warner Bros. animation division, named after Leon Schlesinger
 Schlesinger (crater), a lunar impact crater on the far side of the Moon
 Schlesinger Building, a skyscraper in Braamfontein, Johannesburg, South Africa
 Schlesinger institute, Research institute for Jewish medical ethics, named after Falk Schlesinger M.D.
 Schlesinger Library, a research library at the Radcliffe Institute for Advanced Study, Harvard University, named after Arthur M. Schlesinger, Sr.

Notes

See also 
 Schlessinger
 Shlesinger
 Slesinger
 Slezak
 Slazenger

German-language surnames
German toponymic surnames
Surnames of Silesian origin
Jewish surnames
Silesian Jews
Silesian diaspora
Yiddish-language surnames
Ethnonymic surnames